John Warburton may refer to:

 John Warburton (actor) (1899 or 1903–1981), British-American actor
 John Warburton, founding member of the Unbroadcastable Radio Show
 John Warburton (Baptist) (19th century), leader in the Strict Baptist movement 
 John Warburton (officer of arms) (1682–1759), antiquarian, cartographer, and collector of old manuscripts
 John Warburton (producer) (born 1964), British television producer and director
 John Warburton Paul (1916–2004), British government official
 John Warburton Sagar (1878–1941), English rugby union player and diplomat
 John Warburton (fascist) (1919–2004)
 John Warburton (died 1703), Member of Parliament for Belturbet (Parliament of Ireland constituency)
 John Warburton (died 1806), Member of Parliament for Queen's County (Parliament of Ireland constituency)